Best New Starlet may refer to:

 AVN Award for Best New Starlet
 XBIZ Award for Best New Starlet